Coimbrão is a village and a civil parish of the municipality of Leiria, Portugal. The population in 2011 was 1,735, in an area of 54.62 km2.

References

Parishes of Leiria